Wang Meiling (born 22 February 2000) is a Chinese female tennis player.

Wang has a career-high WTA singles ranking of 417, achieved on 27 August 2018. She also has a career-high WTA doubles ranking of 507, set on 14 January 2019.

Wang made her WTA Tour main-draw debut at the 2018 Tianjin Open, in the doubles draw partnering Liu Yanni.

ITF Circuit finals

Doubles: 3 (1 title, 2 runner-ups)

External links
 
 

2000 births
Living people
Chinese female tennis players
21st-century Chinese women